Domangart mac Domnaill (died 673) was a king in Dál Riata (modern western Scotland) and the son of Domnall Brecc. It is not clear whether he was over-king of Dál Riata or king of the Cenél nGabráin.

Domangart is not listed by the Duan Albanach but is included in other sources, such as genealogies of William the Lion, and that of Causantín mac Cuilén found with the Senchus fer n-Alban. In these genealogies he is noted as the father of Eochaid mac Domangairt.

The Annals of Ulster for 673 report: "The killing of Domangart, son of Domnall Brecc, the king of Dál Riata." Some king-lists state that in his time the Cenél Comgaill separated from the Cenél nGabráin.

It is not clear who succeeded Domangart as king of Dál Riata, if he was such, or as king of the Cenél nGabráin. Known kings after Domangart include Máel Dúin mac Conaill and Domnall Donn of the Cenél nGabráin and Ferchar Fota of the Cenél Loairn is assigned a long reign of 21 years by the Duan Albanach and other king-lists, and this would place the beginning of his rule close to the death of Domangart.

References

 Anderson, Alan Orr, Early Sources of Scottish History A.D 500–1286, volume 1. Reprinted with corrections. Paul Watkins, Stamford, 1990. 
 Bannerman, John, Studies in the History of Dalriada. Scottish Academic Press, Edinburgh, 1974. 
 Broun, Dauvit, The Irish Identity of the Kingdom of the Scots in the Twelfth and Thirteenth Centuries. Boydell, Woodbridge, 1999.

External links
Annals of Ulster at CELT (translated)
Duan Albanach at CELT (translated)

673 deaths
Kings of Dál Riata
7th-century Irish monarchs
7th-century Scottish monarchs
Year of birth unknown